The Professionals was going to be the debut album of the rock band the Professionals. It was originally scheduled for release in 1980 by Virgin Records. However, a legal dispute with bassist Andy Allan over unpaid royalties led to the album being scrapped and re-recorded as I Didn't See It Coming.

In 1991, the album was bootlegged by Limited Edition Records, albeit with a slightly different track listing. One song ("Just Another Dream") was omitted, an alternate version of "All the Way" was added, and other tracks were titled incorrectly. Only 1,000 vinyl records and 1,000 CDs were released of this version.

In 1997, Virgin Records officially released the album with the same name, but featuring another different track listing. It left off one song (b-side "Rockin' Mick") and included two songs recorded later ("Join the Professionals" and "Has Anybody Got an Alibi").

The track "Just Another Dream" has a music video.

Track listings

Original LP (1980)

Limited Edition Records version (1991)

Virgin Records version (1997)

Personnel
The Professionals
Steve Jones − lead vocals, lead guitar
Paul Cook − drums, backing vocals
Andy Allan − bass, backing vocals
Paul Myers − bass (uncredited), backing vocals on "Join the Professionals" and "Has Anyone Got an Alibi"
Ray McVeigh − guitar (uncredited), backing vocals on "Join the Professionals" and "Has Anyone Got an Alibi"
with:
"Gentleman" Jim Macken - handclaps
Technical
Cook 'n' Jones - production 
Mick Glossop - production and engineering on "Join the Professionals" (with The Professionals) and "Has Anyone Got an Alibi"
Nigel Gray - production on "Mad House" and "Kick Down the Doors"
Bill Price, Gary Edwards - engineer

References

1980 debut albums
1991 albums
The Professionals (band) albums
Albums produced by Nigel Gray
Virgin Records albums
Sex Pistols